Constance Howell was a novelist and socialist.

Like many contemporary political novelists like Clementina Black and Margaret Harkness, Howell's novels sometimes suffered from political critique. Her most well-known novel was A More Excellent Way (1888), which is thought to be semi-autobiographical; it recounts the 'counter-conversion' of the protagonist Agatha Hathaway away from Christianity towards freethought. It was reviewed harshly in The Spectator.

Howell also wrote a series of three books for children during the 1880s, which explained elements of Western religious history from a critical freethinking perspective: Biography of Jesus Christ, The After Life of the Apostles and History of the Jews.

References

British socialists
English socialists
English novelists
19th-century English women writers
Year of birth missing
Year of death missing